Four ships in the United States Navy have been named USS Petrel for the sea bird of the same name.

 , a schooner purchased in 1846; later served in the United States Coast Survey
 , a steamship, purchased in 1862; captured in 1864
 , a gunboat, commissioned in 1889 and decommissioned in 1919
 , a Chanticleer-class submarine rescue ship; commissioned 24 September 1946; decommissioned on 30 September 1991

See also

 , a patrol boat in commission from 1917 to 1934 that served as the United States Bureau of Fisheries patrol boat Petrel from 1919 to 1934  

Petrel